Nikolai Nikolaevich Nekhoroshev (2 October 1946 – 18 October 2008) was a prominent Soviet Russian mathematician specializing in classical mechanics and dynamical systems. His research concerned Hamiltonian mechanics, perturbation theory, celestial mechanics, integrable systems, dynamical systems, the quasiclassical approximation, and singularity theory. He proved, in particular, a stability result in KAM-theory stating that, under certain conditions, solutions of nearly integrable systems stay close to invariant tori for exponentially long times .

Nekhoroshev was professor of the Moscow State University and University of Milan. He was an alumnus of Moscow's boarding school no. 18 (1964).

References 
 .

 .
 .

Moscow State University alumni
Academic staff of Moscow State University
Russian mathematicians
Soviet mathematicians
1946 births
2008 deaths
Dynamical systems theorists